Glycosylphosphatidylinositol anchored high density lipoprotein binding protein 1 (GPI-HBP1) also known as high density lipoprotein-binding protein 1 is a protein that in humans is encoded by the GPIHBP1 gene.

Function

Dietary fats are packaged by intestine into triglyceride-rich lipoproteins called chylomicrons. The triglycerides in chylomicrons are hydrolyzed by lipoprotein lipase (LPL) along the luminal surface of capillaries, mainly in heart, skeletal muscle, and adipose tissue. GPIHBP1 is a capillary endothelial cell protein that provides a platform for LPL-mediated processing of chylomicrons.

References

Further reading